SKY Brasil is a company, owned by Vrio, which operates a subscription television service in Brazil. It produces TV content, and owns several TV channels.

History
SKY Mexico was founded on 25 July 1996, a joint venture between British Sky Broadcasting (BSkyB), News Corporation, Liberty Media and Grupo Televisa and was later launched on 15 December 1996. At the same time it was being set up in Brazil, where it involved BSkyB, News Corporation, Liberty Media and Organizações Globo. By May 2000, the company had extended throughout the rest of Latin America, launching in Central America, Argentina and Colombia but during Argentina's economic crisis, on 10 July 2002, with over 52,000 subscribers, Sky Argentina ceased all operations.

During the course of the decade, most Sky operations in Latin America were rebranded to DirecTV, with the exception of the Mexican and Brazilian operations, that in 2005 absorbed the DirecTV keeping the Sky name.

In May 2009, Sky Brazil launched its first ten HDTV channels in 1080i resolution (with the exception of ESPN HD (today ESPN+), which broadcasts in 720p). Currently, Sky Brazil has 57 channels in HDTV in total (note: Sex Zone HD is optional).

In 2016, Sky Brazil has reached more than 5.3 million subscribers, ranking as second in number of subscribers in Brazil.

In 2022, Grupo Globo divested their 7% stake in SKY Brasil, making Vrio their full 100% owner.

Services
 SKY Livre  - Digital decoder with free TV channels and optional prepaid channel packages
 Cine SKY - Movie rental service
 Cine SKY HD - Video On Demand service (Exclusive to Sky HDTV Plus subscribers) (used to be Sky On Demand) 
 SKY Online - TV Everywhere service
 SKY Banda Larga  - 4G Internet via LTE routers
 SKY Tunes - Online audio channels via iOS
 SKY Livre SATHD Regional  - Digital decoder with free TV channels UHF and DTH TV Globo Regional, SBT and Band Nacional and Regional 30 affiliates
 Viva SKY - Loyalty program

See also
 SKY México

References

External links
Sky Brazil official website (in Portuguese)
SKY Master Dealer at Facebook (in Portuguese)

Companies based in São Paulo (state)
Satellite television
Former AT&T subsidiaries
Grupo Globo subsidiaries
Former News Corporation subsidiaries
Former Liberty Media subsidiaries